is a town located in Fukui Prefecture, Japan. ,  the city had an estimated population of 9,643 in 3175 households and the population density of 63 persons per km².

Geography
Mihama is located in southwestern Fukui Prefecture, bordered by Shiga Prefecture to the south and the heavily indented ria coast of Wakasa Bay of Sea of Japan to the north. Parts of the town are within the borders of the Wakasa Wan Quasi-National Park.

Neighbouring municipalities 
Fukui Prefecture
Tsuruga
Wakasa
Shiga Prefecture
Takashima

Climate
Mihama has a Humid climate (Köppen Cfa) characterized by warm, wet summers and cold winters with heavy snowfall.

Demographics
Per Japanese census data, the population of Mihama has declined in recent decades.

History
Mihama is part of ancient Wakasa Province. During the Edo period, the area was part of the holdings of Obama Domain. Following the Meiji restoration, it was organised into part of Mikata District in Fukui Prefecture. With the establishment of the modern municipalities system on April 1, 1889, the villages of Kitasaigō, Minamisaigō, Mimi, and Santō were established. The four villages merged to form the town of Mihama on February 11, 1954.

On August 9, 2004, a non-radioactive steam leak killed five and burnt twelve others in the nearby Mihama Nuclear Power Plant; the high-pressure steam pipe lost 85% of its wall thickness and failed five days before its first inspection since 1976.

Economy
The economy of Mihama, previously dependent on commercial fishing and agriculture, is now very heavily dependent on the nuclear power industry. The closure of the Mihama Nuclear Power Plant since the 2011 Fukushima Nuclear Disaster has crippled the local economy.

Education
Mihama has three public elementary schools and one public middle school operated by the town government. The town does not have a high school.

Transportation

Railway
  JR West - Obama Line
 ,

Highway
 Maizuru-Wakasa Expressway

International relations 
 - Shimen District, New Taipei City, Taiwan, friendship city

Local attractions
Wakasa Wan Quasi-National Park
Mikata Five Lakes, a Ramsar site
Lake Suigetsu

References

External links

 
Tourist website of Mihama 

 
Towns in Fukui Prefecture
Populated coastal places in Japan